Christos Iakovou (born 12 April 1948) is a Greek weightlifter. He competed at the 1968 Summer Olympics, the 1972 Summer Olympics and the 1976 Summer Olympics. He was named the 1975 Greek Male Athlete of the Year.

He later became the chief trainer of the Greek national weightlifting team, presiding over a string of successes in the 1992, 1996, 2000 and 2004 Summer Olympics, with athletes such as Pyrros Dimas, Valerios Leonidis, and Kakhi Kakhiashvili. He resigned in 2008 after 11 out of 14 athletes in the national team were tested positive in a surprise anti-doping inspection.

References

External links
 

1948 births
Living people
Greek male weightlifters
Olympic weightlifters of Greece
Panathinaikos weighlifters
Weightlifters at the 1968 Summer Olympics
Weightlifters at the 1972 Summer Olympics
Weightlifters at the 1976 Summer Olympics
Sportspeople from Istanbul
Constantinopolitan Greeks
Weightlifting coaches
20th-century Greek people